Andrei Turea (born 11 October 1998) is a Romanian luger. He competed in the men's singles event at the 2018 Winter Olympics.

References

External links
 

1998 births
Living people
Romanian male lugers
Olympic lugers of Romania
Lugers at the 2018 Winter Olympics
Place of birth missing (living people)
Lugers at the 2016 Winter Youth Olympics